Henry Randolph Morgan (6 July 1907 – 9 August 1987) was an Irish first-class cricketer.

Morgan was born at Belfast in July 1907, to Richard Morgan and his Cork born wife, Eileen. He was the sixth of eight brothers, alongside three sisters. He was educated in Belfast at the Belfast Royal Academy. He initially played his club cricket for Ulster, however when they folded, he joined North Down in 1932. He made his debut in first-class cricket for Ireland against Scotland at Dublin in 1931. He made three further first-class appearances for Ireland, all coming against Scotland in 1933, 1937 and 1938. A medium-fast bowler with a good off cutter delivery, Morgan took 18 wickets in his four first-class matches, at an average of 10.38. His best innings figures were 7/41 in the 1933 match, with Morgan taking match figures of 10/81. He also scored 54 runs with a highest score of 21. He played club cricket into the 1940s, also playing for North of Ireland, Muckamore, and Eglinton. Outside of cricket, he worked as a manager. He died at Belfast in August 1987.

References

External links

1907 births
1987 deaths
Cricketers from Belfast
People educated at the Belfast Royal Academy
Irish cricketers